Blue Box is a 1996 album released by recording artist Kate Ceberano. The album's second single, "Change" was nominated for two ARIA Awards in 1996.

Background and recording
Following the success of the 1992 Australian leg of Jesus Christ Superstar, Ceberano was inundated with interest from various record labels. She elected to go with Elektra Records and moved to New York to record an album with producer Fred Maher. On the eve of delivering the album to the label, Elekra records named Sylvia Rhone as its chairman and CEO. Rhone sacked seventy-eight artists (including Ceberano) as she wanted to turn the Elektra into a hip hop label and Ceberano's album was scrapped. Some of these songs appeared on Blue Box.

Ceberano returned to Australia where she filmed the TV show and recorded the album Kate Ceberano and Friends, which was released in January 1994. Ceberano hired Richard East as her manager and they signed with Mushroom Records to record a new album. Ceberano and East travelled to London to write and record and whilst East was stayed in London to work on the musical Mamma Mia!, Ceberano travelled to Los Angeles and worked with Mark Goldenberg on a number of songs. Mushroom Records eventually released the album in 1996, which consisted of songs from all of these recording sessions. In her 2014 autobiography, Ceberano said "I'm not sure how the [new] material sat with the Globe songs. After all the arguing, with myself and with other people, over what kind of singer I was, whether I was a jazz singer or a pop singer, Blue Box gave me the confidence to think of myself simply as a singer".

Track listing

Charts

Awards
Ceberano was nominated for two ARIA Music Awards at the 1996 ceremony.

|-
| rowspan=2|1996
| rowspan=2| "Change"
| Best Female Artist
| 
|-
| Best Adult Contemporary Album
| 
|-
|}

References

1996 albums
Kate Ceberano albums
Mushroom Records albums